The 2006 Kerala Legislative Assembly election, part of a series of state assembly elections in 2006, was held in three phases. The first phase was held on 22 April 2006, when 59 out of the 140 constituencies in Kerala voted. The second was held on 29 April for the 66 constituencies in central Kerala. The last phase of polling for the remaining 15 constituencies was on 3 May 2006. The counting was conducted on 11 May 2006.

The Communist Party of India (Marxist) -led Left Democratic Front beat the incumbent Indian National Congress-led United Democratic Front by a margin of 56 seats. V. S. Achuthanandan, who led the CPI(M) was sworn in as the Chief Minister of Kerala on 18 May 2006.

Background
The UDF led government headed by A. K. Antony had won the previous elections held in 2001 by winning 99 seats. He later resigned on 28 August 2004 after UDF's dismal performance in Kerala for the Lok Sabha election that year, winning just one seat. Oommen Chandy replaced him later on 31 August.

Results

Constituency-wise results

References

External links 
 Election Commission of India
 Kerala Assembly Election DATABASE

2006 State Assembly elections in India
State Assembly elections in Kerala
2000s in Kerala